Enteromius oligogrammus is a species of cyprinid fish in the  family Cyprinidae.

It is found in Burundi and Tanzania.
Its natural habitat is rivers.
It is not considered a threatened species by the IUCN.

References

Enteromius
Taxa named by Lore Rose David
Fish described in 1937
Taxonomy articles created by Polbot